Harrisburg usually refers to the city of Harrisburg, Pennsylvania, in the United States, which is the capital of the state of Pennsylvania.

Harrisburg may also refer to:
Harrisburg, Arkansas
Harrisburg, Inyo County, California
Harrisburg, Illinois
Harrisburg, Indiana
Harrisburg, Missouri
Harrisburg, Nebraska
Harrisburg, New York, town in Lewis County
Harrisburg, Cattaraugus County, New York, hamlet in Allegany (town), New York
Harrisburg, Warren County, New York, hamlet in town of Stony Creek, New York
Harrisburg, North Carolina
Harrisburg, Ohio
Harrisburg, Gallia County, Ohio
Harrisburg, Stark County, Ohio
Harrisburg, Oregon
Harrisburg, Pennsylvania
Harrisburg, South Dakota
Harrisburg, Houston, former city in Texas
Harrisburg, Utah, a ghost town
Harrisburg, Virginia

See also
Harrisburg School District (Pennsylvania)
Harrisburg University of Science and Technology

Harris (disambiguation)
Harrisville (disambiguation)
Harrisonburg
USS Harrisburg (disambiguation), a United States Navy ship from 1918 to 1919 at the end of World War I
USS Harrisburg (LPD-30), a San Antonio-class amphibious transport dock ship (as of Monday, December 6th, 2021) is under construction